The Oasis Exhibits form the entrance corridor for Disney's Animal Kingdom, serving a similar purpose as Main Street, U.S.A. at the Magic Kingdom. The exhibits feature waterfalls, exotic plant life, and animals selected for their "gentle disposition." The Oasis was designed to put guests into contact with animals immediately upon entering the park.

Animals shown at the Oasis include giant anteaters, swamp wallabies, babirusa, scarlet macaws, Hyacinth Macaws, military macaws, white ibises, Indian Spotbills, muntjac, African spoonbills, black swans, Bronze-winged Ducks, and Medium Sulphur-crested Cockatoos.

References

External links 
 Walt Disney World Resort - The Oasis Exhibits

Amusement rides introduced in 1998
Disney's Animal Kingdom